

Current

In 2020, the International Bodyboarding Corporation was created in order to run the bodyboarding world tour. For the period of 2020 to 2021, the IBC couldn't effectively run a tour due to the COVID-19 pandemic which impacted global travel. The IBC Bodyboarding World Tour consists of 6 divisions: Men, Women, Dropknee, Junior Men, Junior Women and Master Women.

Tour details

How each division is awarded the 2022 World Champion Title.
 Men and Women: 4 best results
 Junior Men: Best result + Fronton King event
 Junior Women: Best result + Sintra Pro event
 Dropknee: Best result + Sintra Pro event
 Master Women: Single event winner - Wahine Bodyboard Pro

History
The first ever bodyboarding world tour was setup and created by the GOB (Global Organisation of Bodyboarders) in 1994. The GOB remained the controlling organisation of the tour upto 2002. In the final 3 years under the GOB, the tour was developed into a 'Super Tour'. In 2003, the IBA (International Bodyboarding Association) was formed, and they ran the world tour for 10 years, with their final year of being in charge being 2013. The Association of Professional Bodyboarders was formed in 2014 and the APB became the controlling body for the bodyboarding world tour. At the end of 2019, the APB was shut down.

Bodyboarding World Champions

Men

Junior Men

Women

Junior Women

Dropknee

See also

World Surf League

References

External links
 

Bodyboarding
Water sports competitions
Sports competition series
Recurring sporting events established in 1982